The simple-station Biblioteca is part of the TransMilenio mass-transit system of Bogotá, Colombia, opened in the year 2000.

Location

The station is located in southern Bogotá, facing Parque El Tunal and near the Biblioteca El Tunal, from which it gets its name. It is specifically located on Avenida Ciudad de Villavicencio with Calle 51 Sur.

History

In 2002, a few months after the opening of the Portal del Norte, the Avenida Ciudad de Villavicencio line was opened, including this station.

Station Services

Old trunk services

Current Trunk Services

Feeder routes
This station does not have connections to feeder routes.

Inter-city service
This station does not have inter-city service.

External links
 TransMilenio

See also
 Bogotá
 TransMilenio
 List of TransMilenio Stations

TransMilenio